Wonkwangsa International Zen Temple (Korean: , English: Temple of Original Light) is a Korean-tradition zen temple and monastery located in Búbánatvölgy, a valley near Esztergom, Hungary.

The temple is currently run by the Abbot Chong An Sunim. There are lay residents living in the temple that perform various functions, such as Kitchen Master, Head Dharma-Teacher, Garden Master or Moktak Master.

Fundraising for the project started in 2005. A considerable part of the donations are from Buddhist laypeople and temples from Korea. The purchase of the first parcels and the construction of the temple started in November, 2006 with a Master-beam Raising Ceremony of the Zen Hall. The building of the Zen Hall finished and the Foundation-Stone Ceremony of the new Buddha Hall was in April, 2010.

The Zen Hall is built in traditional Korean architectural style. Wonkwangsa is the only architecturally traditional Korean temple in Europe.

Wonkwangsa Temple has strong connections to the Jogye Order of Korean Buddhism. In 2020, the abbot and the temple joined the Taego Order of Korean Buddhism.

Public events 
The Wonkwangsa temple holds marriage ceremonies, 49-day remembering ceremonies, burial ceremonies, precepts ceremonies (usually held at the end of a retreat) and other ceremonies requested by mostly laypeople.

Retreats 
Since 2008, the temple has given space for the 90-day winter Kyol Che in Europe for the Kwan Um School of Zen. There are 100-day Kwan seum bosal chanting retreats (kido) in every summer, beginning in June. 
Intensive, 3- to 7-day long retreats called 'Yong Maeng Jeong Jin'.

Gallery

See also 
List of Buddhist temples
Zen
Korean architecture
Jogye Order of Korean Buddhism
Kwan Um School of Zen
Korean Buddhism
Buddhism in Hungary

External links 
 
 360° interactive spherical panorama pictures of the temple buildings

21st-century Buddhist temples
Religious buildings and structures completed in 2006
Buildings and structures in Esztergom